The ZEC Chapeau de Paille is a "zone d'exploitation contrôlée" (controlled harvesting zone) (zec), located in the Mekinac Regional County Municipality, in administrative region of Mauricie, in Quebec (Canada).

This Zec which was created in 1978, is administered by the Association Nature inc.

Toponymy 

The name of the hunting and fishing from Lake Chapeau de Paille to which the surrounding terrain remind the shape of the straw hat.

Geography 

It shares its boundaries with the Zec du Gros-Brochet at the north, Zec Wessonneau in northeast, Saint-Maurice Wildlife Reserve in the east, La Mauricie National Park southeast and Mastigouche Wildlife Reserve to the south. It also enclaves Ecological Reserve Irénée-Marie.

The territory of the Zec covers cantons (townships): Badeaux, Arcand, Lordship of Cap-de-la-Madeleine, Brehault, Livernois and Normand.

Lakes of the Zec subject to regulations on fishery by Government of Quebec are: Lakes des Aigles (Eagles lake), Bill, Bouchard, Bon-Air, Boulter, "de la Buse" (the Hawk), Cadotte, "à la chienne", "des Chaussées" (Roadways), Clara, "Grand lac du Couteau" (Grand Lake Knife), "de la Culbute Sud" (the South Somersault), Descoste, Descoteaux, Duff, "au Glacier", Godin, Hilda, Lafleur, Lessard, "à la ligne", Loa, Madelon, Montagne, Narrow, Grand Lake Pepin, Râteau (rake), Regis, Rusty, Ruth, Siffleux, Willard and Winfield.

See also

Related articles
 Wessonneau River
 Saint-Maurice River
 Rivière aux Rats (La Tuque)
 Zec du Gros-Brochet
 Zec Wessonneau
 Saint-Maurice Wildlife Reserve
 La Mauricie National Park
 Mekinac Regional County Municipality
 Zone d'exploitation contrôlée (Controlled Harvesting Zone) (ZEC)

References

External links 
 
 

Mékinac Regional County Municipality
Protected areas of Mauricie